Maria Casentini (1778-1805) was an Austrian ballet dancer.

She was engaged in Venice 1788-95 and at the Theater am Kärntnertor in 1796-1804 and internationally famous in her time. She is most known for her performance in Das Waldmädchen by Paul Wranitzky and Giuseppe Trafieri (1796), where she premiered the titular role of the feral girl found in the forest by a Polish prince.

References 

1778 births
1805 deaths
18th-century Austrian ballet dancers
19th-century Austrian ballet dancers